Noorda purpureiplagialis is a moth in the family Crambidae. It was described by Rothschild in 1916. It is found in New Guinea.

References

Moths described in 1916
Crambidae